An IRS impersonation scam is a class of telecommunications fraud and scam which targets American taxpayers by pretending to be Internal Revenue Service (IRS) collection officers.  The scammers operate by placing disturbing official-sounding calls to unsuspecting citizens, threatening them with arrest and frozen assets if thousands of dollars are not paid immediately, usually via gift cards or money orders. According to the IRS, over 1,029,601 Americans have received threatening calls, and $29,100,604 has been reported lost to these call scams as of March 2016.  The problem has been assigned to the Treasury Inspector General for Tax Administration.

The scammers often request payment in the form of gift cards such as Google Play or iTunes cards, wire transfer, MoneyGram, or credit card.

, several people from India have been arrested for impersonating IRS employees.

The United Kingdom 
Variations on this scam have targeted British taxpayers, pretending to be from HM Revenue and Customs (HMRC).  Sometimes the scammers use telephone calls, sometimes SMS text messages, and sometimes emails. Versions include:
The scammers threaten a lawsuit by HMRC to recover money allegedly owed.
The scammers tell people that they are due a tax rebate, and use this to trick them into disclosing their account and personal details.

Canada
Another variation similarly targets Canadians by impersonating the Canada Revenue Agency and utilizing aggressive fear tactics, with at least 60,000 Canadian residents filing complaints from 2013 to 2018.

Response by companies
In response to a modus operandi by scammers where they coax victims into buying prepaid cards or gift cards for online services, companies such as Apple, along with the Federal Trade Commission, have posted advisories warning customers over the illicit use of gift cards by scammers, and not to give out the code to anyone they do not know. Retailers and supermarkets have also followed suit by putting up similar warnings on prepaid and gift card sections. Amazon has also warned of the dangers of these scams by advising customers not to use Amazon.com Gift Cards for payment outside of Amazon or its affiliated properties and not to use gift cards for other retailers and brands outside of the intended brand. Google Play has also published a similar warning on their website.

See also
FBI
IRS
IRS Criminal Investigation Division
Confidence trick
Tech support scam
Scambaiting
SSA impersonation scam

References

External links
 IRS primer video
 IRS Tax Scam Consumer Alert

Confidence tricks
Fraud in the United States
Fraud in India
Internal Revenue Service